Zhao Yuhao (born 7 April 1993) is a Chinese footballer who currently plays for Henan Songshan Longmen in the Chinese Super League.

Club career
Zhao started his professional football career in 2011 when he was loaned to China League Two club Wenzhou Provenza from Hangzhou Greentown for one year. He was promoted to Hangzhou Greentown's first team squad by Takeshi Okada in 2013. On 22 May 2013, he made his debut for Hangzhou in the third round of 2013 Chinese FA Cup against amateur team Wuhan Hongxin in a 1–0 home victory. His Super League debut came on 21 September 2013 in a game against Wuhan Zall.

In January 2017, Zhao moved to Super League side Hebei China Fortune after Hangzhou's relegation. He made his debut for Hebei on 5 March 2017 in the first match of the season which Hebei tied with Henan Jianye 0–0. On 7 May 2017, he scored his first senior goal in a 4–1 away win against Beijing Guoan.

International career
On 10 November 2017, Zhao made his debut for the Chinese national team in a 2–0 loss against Serbia.

Career statistics 
Statistics accurate as of match played 31 December 2020.

References

External links
 
 

1993 births
Living people
Footballers from Yunnan
Sportspeople from Kunming
Zhejiang Professional F.C. players
Hebei F.C. players
Chinese Super League players
Association football defenders
China international footballers
Chinese footballers